Senator Doran may refer to:

Michael Doran (Minnesota politician) (1827–1915), Minnesota State Senate
W. J. Doran (1886–1949), Missouri State Senate